Aysgarth School is an independent day and boarding preparatory school near to the village of Newton-le-Willows, North Yorkshire, England. As the name suggests, it was originally opened in the village of Aysgarth but was moved to Newton-le-Willows in 1890.

History
The school was opened in 1877 by the Reverend Clement Hales to prepare boys for a secondary school education. In 1890, the school moved to newly built premises costing £20,000 in the village of Newton-le-Willows but retained the name of Aysgarth School. The chapel was a new building too, but contained items from elsewhere, such as the pulpit which was originally from Easby Abbey near Richmond. Whilst the chapel on site is a listed building, the rest of the buildings remain unlisted due to a significant fire on site in 1933 which destroyed much of the school.

The school is a preparatory school for selection to a range of private and independent schools across the United Kingdom and offers places to boys between the ages of 8 and 13 and also runs a pre-prep (or preparatory nursery) open to boys and girls between the ages of 3 and 7. Its independent status means that it is assessed by the Independent Schools Inspectorate for reporting purposes rather than Ofsted.

The school has been described as one of the leading prep schools for boys and the only single-sex school of its kind north of Oxford. Its admissions policy is non-selective and fosters a culture of allowing boys to be boys in a safe but calming environment. The school is one of many who allow pets into the class and Aysgarth School encourages Housemasters to allow their dogs into class. The school's ethos is based on Christian values and principles, and as such, boarders are expected to attend services in the chapel on site for church services.

The school's motto is Ex quercu non ex salice (Latin for of oak, not of willow), and former pupils are known as Aysgarthians.

Notable Aysgarthians
John Cracroft-Amcotts, former High Sheriff of Lincolnshire
Sir (Henry) Grattan Bushe, Lawyer and colonial governor
George Butterworth, Composer and folk-dancer
Basil Guy, Victoria Cross recipient
David Ince, RAF pilot who flew 150 missions over Germany during the Second World War and who was awarded the DFC
James John Joicey, amateur entomologist who made significant contributions to the Natural History Museum's collection of Lepidoptera
Richard Meinertzhagen, Soldier and ornithologist
Matthew Pinsent, Olympic rower
David Rogers, Anglican priest
Jonathan Ruffer, Philanthropist
Robert Swan, Polar explorer

References

External links
School website

 
Educational institutions established in 1877
Boarding schools in North Yorkshire
Preparatory schools in North Yorkshire
1877 establishments in England